The 1963 Pacific typhoon season has no official bounds; it ran year-round in 1963, but most tropical cyclones tend to form in the northwestern Pacific Ocean between June and December. These dates conventionally delimit the period of each year when most tropical cyclones form in the northwestern Pacific Ocean.

The scope of this article is limited to the Pacific Ocean, north of the equator and west of the International Date Line. Storms that form east of the date line and north of the equator are called hurricanes; see 1963 Pacific hurricane season. Tropical Storms formed in the entire west pacific basin were assigned a name by the Joint Typhoon Warning Center. Tropical depressions in this basin have the "W" suffix added to their number. Tropical depressions that enter or form in the Philippine area of responsibility are assigned a name by the Philippine Atmospheric, Geophysical and Astronomical Services Administration or PAGASA. This can often result in the same storm having two names. This was the first season in which PAGASA assigned local names to typhoons.

Systems
36 tropical depressions formed this year in the Western Pacific, of which 25 became tropical storms. 19 storms reached typhoon intensity, of which 8 reached super typhoon strength.

Tropical Depression 03W

A brief tropical depression developed north of Papua New Guinea at 00:00 UTC on March 25, and tracked west-northwest before it dissipated later that day.

CMA Tropical Depression 1

The China Meteorological Administration (CMA) analyzed the formation of a disturbance near Micronesia on March 30, though no other agencies monitored the system. Tracking westward, the low-pressure area developed further into a tropical depression the following day. The storm turned towards the north on April 1, reaching peak intensity two days later with winds of 55 km/h and a minimum pressure of 1001 mbar (hPa) before slowly weakening. On April 6, the depression degenerated into a remnant area of low pressure; these remnants tracked westward before dissipating early the next day.

Typhoon Olive

In its nascent stages, the disturbance tracked slowly west-northwestward toward Woleai; the Japan Meteorological Agency (JMA) considers the storm to have developed into a tropical depression on April 26, though the JTWC began monitoring Olive as a  tropical storm the day after. Olive quickly intensified following tropical cyclogenesis, becoming a typhoon by 12:00 UTC on April 27. As the typhoon receded to more northerly latitudes, it slowly weakened, transitioning into an extratropical cyclone on May 5 before dissipating four days later; maintaining typhoon strength for 8.5 days, Olive remained a typhoon longer than any other storm in 1963.

As Olive neared Guam, then-governor Manuel Guerrero ordered the evacuation of low-lying areas and the opening of shelters at schools, churches, and other locations. Olive caused considerable damage in the Mariana Islands: 95 percent of homes on Saipan sustained extensive damage, with another 5 percent destroyed by the storm. Homes were also damaged on nearby Rota, with the widespread loss of crops; property and agricultural losses were also accrued on Guam and Tinian, where power lines were downed by strong winds and 1,000 people were left homeless. The effects of the typhoon set back Guam's recovery from Typhoon Karen the previous year, damaging homes partially repaired via recovery loans for Karen. Estimated damage from Olive amounted to US$5 million. In the storm's aftermath, deputy high commissioner for the Trust Territory of the Pacific Islands Jose Benitez requested the declaration of Tinian and Saipan as disaster areas. On April 30, then-U.S. President John F. Kennedy acknowledged Benitez's request and declared a disaster area for the impacted islands. Kennedy would later allocate US$1.3 million for storm relief in Saipan, Tinian, and Rota. Food and medical supplies were sent from the Caroline and Marshall Islands to the Mariana Islands.

Typhoon Polly (Auring)

The JMA determined that the disturbance developed into a tropical depression on May 27, though the JTWC initiated warnings on the system on May 31. The cyclone gradually strengthened after formation, reaching tropical storm strength on June 1 and typhoon intensity the day after. The extratropical remnants of Polly reached the Bering Sea and the coast of Alaska on June 10 before dissipating.

Remaining offshore Japan, Polly's impacts were caused primarily by heavy rainfall. Flooding inundated caused 807 landslides and inundated over 36,000 homes. Another 11 houses and 270 bridges were washed away by the floods. Polly caused an estimated US$138 million in damage to crops, with the total damage figure in excess of US$143 million. Eighteen people were killed and another seventeen were injured; 20,702 others were homeless after Polly's passage.

Tropical Storm Rose (Bebeng)

Tropical Storm Rose began as a tropical depression in the South China Sea on June 6, and tracked southeastward towards Luzon in its early stages. On June 8, the JTWC began issuing warnings on Rose as a tropical storm while the cyclone was just off Luzon's northwestern coast. Slow strengthening continued thereafter, with Rose's peaking as a  tropical storm as it was tracking across the Ryukyu Islands, though the storm's strongest winds were contained within a narrow rainband near the center. Moving rapidly northeastward, Rose passed over western Honshu as a lower-end tropical storm on June 13, briefly emerging into the Sea of Japan before recurving eastward and transitioning into an extratropical cyclone over northern Honshu on June 14. The remnants of Rose merged with another weak extratropical low off the Japanese coast, and this combined system continued eastward before dissipating over the Bering Sea on June 18.

Typhoon Shirley (Karing)

Typhoon Trix (Diding)

Tropical Storm Virginia (Etang)

Tropical Depression Gening
A system that lasted from July 11–13.

Typhoon Wendy (Herming)

CMA Tropical Depression 09

Typhoon Agnes (Ising)

Typhoon Bess

On July 27 Tropical Depression 20W formed in the West Pacific. It drifted northward, reaching tropical storm on the 30th before turning to the southwest. Bess turned to the north on August 2, and reached typhoon status early on the 3rd. Bess rapidly intensified to a peak of 150 mph on the 4th, but weakened as it continued northward. On the 9th it struck Japan, and on the 11th Bess became extratropical. At the time, Bess had the longest longevity of a Western Pacific tropical cyclone.
Typhoon Bess caused severe damage on the island of Kyūshū. 23 people were killed and 6 were missing.

Tropical Depression 21W

Typhoon Carmen (Luding)

CMA Tropical Depression 14

Typhoon Elaine

Typhoon Della

Tropical Depression Mameng

Typhoon Faye (Neneng)

Typhoon Faye struck Hong Kong killing 3 people.

CMA Tropical Depression 17

Tropical Depression 26W

CMA Tropical Depression 19

Typhoon Gloria (Oniang)

Typhoon Gloria, known in the Philippines as Typhoon Oniang was a typhoon of the 1963 Pacific typhoon season. Gloria impacted Taiwan and China.

Typhoon Gloria developed on September 5, over the open waters of the West Pacific. The storm rapidly intensified to a peak of 155 mph on September 9. It weakened as it continued west-northwestward, and made landfall on extreme northeastern Taiwan on September 11, as a 100 mph typhoon. The typhoon caused severe flooding in Northern Taiwan and killed hundreds of people. Gloria continued westward, and hit eastern China that night as an 85 mph typhoon. The storm looped over land to the northeast, and dissipated on September 13, to the east of China. Gloria killed 239 people, and left 89 missing.

Tropical Storm Hester (Pepang)

Tropical Storm Irma

Typhoon Judy

CMA Tropical Depression 25

Typhoon Kit (Rosing)

Typhoon Lola

Typhoon Mamie

Tropical Depression Nina

Typhoon Ora

Tropical Storm Phyllis (Sisang)

Typhoon Rita (Trining)

Typhoon Susan

Storm names

International

Philippines

The Philippine Atmospheric, Geophysical and Astronomical Services Administration uses its own naming scheme for tropical cyclones in their area of responsibility. PAGASA assigns names to tropical depressions that form within their area of responsibility and any tropical cyclone that might move into their area of responsibility. Should the list of names for a given year prove to be insufficient, names are taken from an auxiliary list, the first 10 of which are published each year before the season starts. Names not retired from this list will be used again in the 1967 season. PAGASA uses its own naming scheme that starts in the Filipino alphabet, with names of Filipino female names ending with "ng" (A, B, K, D, etc.). This was the first season in which PAGASA assigned local names to typhoons.

See also

1963 Atlantic hurricane season
1963 Pacific hurricane season
1963 North Indian Ocean cyclone season

References

External links
Japan Meteorological Agency
Joint Typhoon Warning Center .
China Meteorological Agency
National Weather Service Guam
Hong Kong Observatory
Macau Meteorological Geophysical Services
Korea Meteorological Agency
Philippine Atmospheric, Geophysical and Astronomical Services Administration
Taiwan Central Weather Bureau
Digital Typhoon - Typhoon Images and Information
Typhoon2000 Philippine typhoon website